Maria Elisa Muchavo (born 26 July 1992 in Maputo) is a disabled track and field athlete from Mozambique who won a silver medal at the 2014 Commonwealth Games in the T12 100 metres event. She was her country's first woman to compete at the Summer Paralympics, doing so in 2012. She was a 200 metres bronze medallist at the 2011 All-Africa Games.

References

Living people
1992 births
Mozambican female sprinters
Sportspeople from Maputo
Visually impaired sprinters
Athletes (track and field) at the 2012 Summer Paralympics
Paralympic athletes of Mozambique
Athletes (track and field) at the 2014 Commonwealth Games
Commonwealth Games medallists in athletics
Commonwealth Games silver medallists for Mozambique
African Games silver medalists for Mozambique
African Games medalists in athletics (track and field)
African Games bronze medalists for Mozambique
Athletes (track and field) at the 2011 All-Africa Games
Athletes (track and field) at the 2015 African Games
Paralympic sprinters
Medallists at the 2014 Commonwealth Games